Mark Gray (born 12 November 1967) is an Australian cross-country skier. He competed in the men's 10 kilometre classical event at the 1994 Winter Olympics.

References

External links
 

1967 births
Living people
Australian male cross-country skiers
Olympic cross-country skiers of Australia
Cross-country skiers at the 1994 Winter Olympics
Skiers from Melbourne
20th-century Australian people